Cineraria lyratiformis is a species of flowering plant in the family Asteraceae, native to in South Africa and Lesotho. It is a toxic plant that has been declared a noxious weed in New South Wales, Australia.

References

Lyratiformis
Flora of South Africa